Saulos Klaus Chilima (born 12 February 1973) is a Malawian economist and politician who is the incumbent vice president of the Republic of Malawi. Chilima assumed office on 28 June 2020, winning the majority alongside presidential candidate Lazarus Chakwera. Chilima also served as the Minister of Economic Planning and Development, as well as Head of Public Sector Reforms, a position he also previously held under the administration of former president Peter Mutharika. Before joining politics, Chilima held key leadership positions in various multi-national companies including Unilever, Coca-Cola and Airtel Malawi, where he rose to become Chief Executive Officer.

In February 2014, Chilima was announced as the running mate of Democratic Progressive Party (DPP) presidential candidate Peter Mutharika for the May 2014 presidential election.

Chilima later left the ruling Democratic Progressive Party (DPP) to form the United Transformation Movement (UTM), and contested in the nullified 2019 general election.

Early life and education
Born on 12 February 1973 at Queen Elizabeth Central Hospital, in Blantyre, Malawi, Chilima is the first child of Henderson Brown Chilima of Ching’anga Village, T/A Njewa, Lilongwe and Elizabeth Frances Chilima of Mbilintengerenji Village, T/A Champiti, Ntcheu. Chilima spent most of his early life in Blantyre where his parents were working and, like most children during his time, spent his long school (summer) holidays with his paternal and maternal grandparents in the villages of Lilongwe and Ntcheu, respectively.

Chilima did his primary school at HHI and Dharap primary schools, and his secondary education at the Marist Brothers Mtendere Secondary School Thiwi in the Dedza District. He went on to the University of Malawi, Chancellor College, where he graduated with a degree in social sciences in 1994. After working for a few years, he returned to his alma mater to pursue a master's degree in Knowledge Management, graduating in 2006. On 10 August 2015, Chilima received his Ph.D in Knowledge Management from the University of Bolton in the United Kingdom.

Professional career
A marketer by profession, Chilima started his work career at Lever Brothers (Mw) Limited (now Unilever) before moving on to the Leasing and Finance Company of Malawi, and later Southern Bottlers Limited (now Castel Malawi). His last professional assignment was at Airtel Malawi where he was hired to lead its sales team before being named the first-ever local managing director for the company in 2010.

Chilima's most notable professional career successes include spearheading the strategic and breakthrough projects at Airtel, namely Project Precision, Yabooka, Airtel Money, and a 3G network upgrade, which resulted in significant impacts on the business revenue and employee engagement, growing Airtel Malawi's annual revenue by 75% over a period of three years from USD54m in 2010 to USD95m in 2013.

Political career
On 21 July 2018, Chilima launched his transformation movement called United Transformation Movement (UTM) towards formation of his political party to contest in May 2019 elections.   On 1 February 2019 Chilima's UTM held meetings with two other political parties and an alliance of smaller political parties aimed at forming a united opposition. The other parties to the discussion were the Alliance for Democracy (Aford), former Malawi President Joyce Banda's Peoples Party, and the Tikonze People's Movement led by former Vice President Cassim Chilumpha. They agreed to field one presidential candidate for the May 2019 elections. Both Joyce Banda and Cassim Chilumpha later withdrew from the alliance citing "disagreement with the selection of a presidential running mate for the candidate of the upcoming election" as their reason.

In the 2019 Malawian general election that was later nullified, Chilima alongside Dr Michael Usi as a running mate came third with 20.24% of the popular vote and UTM won 4 seats in the National Assembly. The presidential election of 2019 was held again in 2020.

In the 2020 presidential election, Chilima contested the race as Lazarus Chakwera's running mate for the Malawi Congress Party, in the Tonse alliance which brought up to nine opposition political parties with hopes to topple the Mutharika administration.

On June 22 2022, Chilima was stripped of his delegated powers as a vice president due to his involvement in a $150m corruption scandal.

Outreach
Previously, Chilima also served as minister for disaster relief and public events.

Chilima is a member of the Leadership Council of Compact 2025, a partnership that develops and disseminates evidence-based advice to politicians and other decision-makers aimed at ending hunger and undernutrition by 2025, and has written on the topic of malnutrition. He has spoken on sustainable and  inclusive development and at international conferences on ending hunger.

Chilima has voiced his advocacy of environmentalism and of physical fitness and sports participation, a stern critic of corruption in politics, and an active supporter of the Archdiocesan seminaries. As a student he was known as championing multi-party democracy.

Personal life
A devout Roman Catholic, Chilima is married to Mary (née Chibambo) and they have two children, Sean and Elizabeth.

References

Living people
University of Malawi alumni
Vice-presidents of Malawi
Chilima, Saulos
People from Ntcheu District
Malawian Roman Catholics
Alumni of the University of Bolton
United Transformation Movement politicians